William Roscoe Thayer (January 16, 1859 – September 7, 1923) was an American author and editor who wrote about Italian history.

Biography
Thayer was born in Boston, Massachusetts on January 16, 1859. He studied at St. Mark's Academy, Concord, New Hampshire, traveled with a private tutor in Europe, and graduated from Harvard University in 1881, in the class with Theodore Roosevelt. For several years, he was assistant editor of the Philadelphia Evening Bulletin. He then returned to Harvard, receiving the degree of A.M. in 1886.

He was editor of the Harvard Graduates' Magazine from its foundation in 1892 until 1915. In 1903, at the International Historical Congress at Rome, he represented both Harvard University and the American Historical Association, and in 1906 was their representative at the Italian Historical Congress in Milan. In 1902, he was made Knight of the Order of the Crown of Italy, and in 1917 Knight of the Order of Saints Maurizio and Lazaro. In 1914, he was elected to The American Academy of Arts and Letters and he received honorary degrees from Harvard, Yale, Brown and other universities. Thayer served as a member of the Harvard Board of Overseers from 1913 until 1919.

He was president of the American Historical Association from 1918 to 1919. He died on September 7, 1923 in Cambridge, Massachusetts.

Works

Verse
 The Confessiones of Hermes (1884)
 Hesper, an American Drama (1888)
 Poems, New and Old (1894)

Prose
 The Influence of Emerson (1886)
 An Historical Sketch of Harvard University, From its Foundation to May, 1890 (1890)
 The Dawn of Italian Independence (1893)
 The Best Elizabethan Plays (1895)
 History and Customs of Harvard University (1898)
 Throne-Makers (1899)
 A Short History of Venice (1905)
 Longfellow: Our National Poet (1907)
 Life and Times of Cavour (two volumes, 1911)
 Life and Letters of John Hay (1915)
 Germany vs. Civilization (1916)
 The Letters of John Holmes to James Russell Lowell and Others (1917)
 The Collapse of Superman (1918)
 Democracy: Discipline: Peace (1919)
 Theodore Roosevelt: An Intimate Biography (1919 Grosset & Dunlap)
 George Washington (1922)

References

External links 

 
 
 William Roscoe Thayer Papers at Houghton Library, Harvard University

1859 births
1923 deaths
American biographers
19th-century American historians
19th-century American poets
American male poets
American political writers
The Harvard Lampoon alumni
19th-century American male writers
American male biographers
Members of the American Academy of Arts and Letters